WIN 56,098 is a chemical that is considered to be an aminoalkylindole derivative. It is a tricyclic aryl derivative that acts as a competitive antagonist at the CB2 cannabinoid receptor. Its activity at CB1 was significantly less effective. WIN 56,098 failed to antagonize any of the in vivo effects of THC.

See also
 WIN 55,212-2
 WIN 55,225

References 

Cannabinoids
Aminoalkylindoles
WIN compounds
4-Morpholinyl compunds
Anthracenes